Nathan Garrett, also known as the criminal Black Knight, is a fictional character appearing in American comic books published by Marvel Comics. He was a supervillain and descendant of the original Black Knight, and was created by writer-editor Stan Lee and artist and co-plotter Dick Ayers.

Publication history
Professor Nathan Garrett debuted as the modern-day supervillain Black Knight in Tales to Astonish #52 (Feb. 1964). This villainous Black Knight appeared in The Avengers #6, 14-15 (July 1964, March–April 1965), and in the "Iron Man" feature in Tales of Suspense #73 (Jan. 1966), in which he was mortally wounded.

Fictional character biography
Professor Nathan Garrett is the distant direct descendant of Sir Percy, and was born in London, England. He becomes a biologist, research scientist, and university professor. He then became the head of an espionage ring, and was captured by the hero Giant-Man. Garrett fled to Europe, where he found Sir Percy's tomb and the Ebony Blade. Garrett's evil tendencies make him unworthy of wielding the sword, and he is shunned by Sir Percy's ghost. The embittered Garrett then devises an arsenal of medieval weapons that employ modern technology (including a lance that fired bolts of energy) and genetically engineers and creates a winged horse called Aragorn. Calling himself the "Black Knight", Garrett embarks on a career as a professional criminal to spite his ancestor. He battled Giant-Man again and the Wasp but is defeated.

Garrett joins the supervillain team known as the Masters of Evil at the request of master villain Baron Heinrich Zemo as the counterpart to Giant-Man, and spreads Adhesive X over the city. However, with the help of jailed villain Paste-Pot Pete, the Avengers find an antidote and the Teen Brigade apply it to the containers, causing it to free the people. The Black Knight is defeated by Thor, as Captain America had decided to catch the Masters of Evil off guard by the Avengers 'switching' foes. He later attacked Stark Industries' plant to lure the hero Iron Man into battle, and was defeated. Alongside the Masters of Evil, he again battled the Avengers and is captured. The Black Knight was among the villains assembled by Doctor Doom to destroy the Fantastic Four.

Garrett kidnaps Happy Hogan and falls from his winged horse while trying to kill Iron Man. Mortally wounded, the dying Garrett summons his nephew Dane Whitman to their family estate, reveals his secret identity and repents for his life of crime, with Whitman deciding to adopt the Black Knight identity himself.

After his death, Garrett is resurrected by Immortus as a member of the Legion of the Unliving. He battled Hank Pym once more, and "dies" again. His horse is found by Victoria Frankenstein, great-granddaughter of Victor Frankenstein (creator of Frankenstein's Monster) who tried to restore the horse to normal, but instead only mutated further. The horse (now called the Hellhorse) later became the property of the supervillain Dreadknight.

Powers and abilities
Nathan Garrett was a normal man with gifted intelligence. He had a Ph.D. in genetics, was a brilliant biologist specializing in genetic engineering, and was a skilled electrical engineer as well.

Garrett created a power-lance which fired heat beams, electrical charges, and concussive electromagnetic force beams. He also used a rope as a lasso, steel cables as bolas, red-hot spinning metal discs, and electrical energy-drainers which resembled doughnuts. He carried a paralyzer pistol which fired nerve gas that could paralyze or kill an opponent. He wore body armor made of an unknown steel alloy.

He was a skilled equestrian, and rode a winged black horse that he created by genetic engineering.

Reception
 In 2022, CBR.com ranked Nathan Garrett 10th in their "Black Knight's 10 Strongest Villains" list.

Other versions

Heroes Reborn
In the Heroes Reborn universe, created by Franklin Richards, the Black Knight appeared as a member of Loki's Masters of Evil. He is killed by Doctor Doom when he tries to gain an "audience" with him.

In other media

Television
 Nathan Garrett appears in the "Captain America" and "Iron Man" segments of The Marvel Super Heroes, voiced by Len Carlson. This version is a member of Heinrich Zemo's Masters of Evil.
 Nathan Garrett appears in Iron Man: Armored Adventures, voiced by Alistair Abell. This version is a Maggia enforcer under Count Nefaria.

Video games
 The Nathan Garrett incarnation of the Black Knight is a playable character in the Masters of Evil DLC pack for Lego Marvel's Avengers.
 Nathan Garrett incarnation of the Black Knight appears in Lego Marvel Super Heroes 2. He and the Enchantress are sent into the Medieval England section of Chronopolis, where they take over Sir Percy's castle. Garrett then poses as Sir Percy until he is exposed by Captain Avalon, who joins forces with Captain America, Doctor Strange, and Star-Lord to defeat Garrett and the Enchantress as well as free Sir Percy.

Miscellaneous
Nathan Garrett appears in The Avengers: United They Stand tie-in comics, wherein he attempts to steal a device from A.I.M.

References

External links
 Black Knight (Nathan Garrett) at Marvel.com
 Black Knight (Nathan Garrett) at Marvel Wiki

Characters created by Dick Ayers
Characters created by Stan Lee
Comics characters introduced in 1964
Fictional biologists
Fictional electrical engineers
Fictional geneticists
Fictional knights
Fictional people from London
Marvel Comics scientists
Marvel Comics supervillains